Darreh Tu-ye Olya (also Romanized as Darreh Tū-ye ‘Olyā; also known as Darreh Tū) is a village in Seydun-e Shomali Rural District, Seydun District, Bagh-e Malek County, Khuzestan Province, Iran. At the 2006 census, its population was 235, in 46 families.

References 

Populated places in Bagh-e Malek County